Prema Mandiram is a 1981 Indian Telugu-language drama film, produced by D. Ramanaidu under the Suresh Productions banner and directed by Dasari Narayana Rao. It stars Akkineni Nageswara Rao and Jaya Prada, with music composed by K. V. Mahadevan.

Plot
The film begins during the times of the Pre-independence era when a province headed by Zamindar Bhupathi Raja (Gummadi) who has two sons Sarvarayudu (Akkineni Nageswara Rao) & Vikram (Jaggayya) and his father's word is an ordinance to Sarvarayudu. Zamindar is a stubborn & ruthless person adhere to caste & family prestige. Due to which he slaughters Vikram for loving a poor girl (Geetha). At present, Zamindar locks his grandson Chinnababu (again Akkineni Nageswara Rao) in the palace and makes him educated within the boundaries. Frustrated, Chinnababu escapes for learning the outside world. Be cognizant to it, Sarvarayudu hides the truth from Zamindar and moves in search of his son. Unfortunately, Chinnababu lands in a prostitute's house where he gets acquainted with a beautiful girl Madhura Ranjani (Jayaprada), a woman with a noble character and they fall in love. Discovering it, Sarvarayudu gets his son back but somehow he escapes again & again and reaches Madhura. Here Sarvarayudu does not want to reveal this fact to Zamindar as it is a danger to his son's life. So, he requests Madhura to make herself low before Chinnababu to discard and she does so. Now distressed Chinnababu becomes drunkard even grief-stricken Madhura becomes terminally-ill. Later on, Chinnababu realizes the truth and decides to marry Madhura. Being aware of it, furious Zamindar orders Sarvarayudu to slay out them. At that point of time, Sarvarayudu performs their marriage and welcomes to the palace. During their first night, he says that he has poisoned them but actually, gives it to his father and consumes himself. At last, Zamindar dies. Finally, Sarvarayudu blesses the couple, states that love is beyond any caste & clan and breathes his last, happy.

Cast
Akkineni Nageswara Rao as Pedababu Sarvarayudu & Chinnababu (dual role)
Jaya Prada as Madhura Ranjani 
Gummadi as Bhupati Raja 
Jaggayya as Vikram 
Satyanarayana as Diwanji
Allu Ramalingaiah as Aachary 
Sridhar as Madhura's brother 
Nagesh as Lavakusalu
Chalam as Lavakusalu
Sarathi as Servant 
P. J. Sarma as Britisher
Ambika as Hema 
Geetha as Vikram 's wife
Suryakantam as Anya Ranjani
Rajasulochana as Sabha Ranjani
Rama Prabha as Madhura Vani 
Nirmalamma as Raja Ranjani

Crew
Art: S. Krishna Rao
Choreography: Saleem
Lyrics: C. Narayana Reddy, Aarudhra, Veturi, Dasari Narayana Rao
Playback: S. P. Balasubrahmanyam, P. Susheela, S. Janaki
Music: K. V. Mahadevan
Editing: K. A. Marthand
Cinematography: P. S. Selvaraj
Producer: D. Ramanaidu
Story - Screenplay - Dialogues - Director: Dasari Narayana Rao
Banner: Suresh Productions
Release Date: 19 September 1981

Soundtrack

Music composed by K. V. Mahadevan. Music released on SEA Records Audio Company.

Others
 VCDs and DVDs on - VOLGA Videos, Hyderabad

References

Films directed by Dasari Narayana Rao
Films scored by K. V. Mahadevan